Peter Dens (12 September 169015 February 1775) was a Flemish Roman Catholic theologian.

Biography
Dens was born at Boom near Antwerp. Most of his life was spent in the archiepiscopal college of Mechelen, where he was for twelve years reader in theology and for forty president. His great work was the Theologia moralis et dogmatica, a compendium in catechetical form of Roman Catholic doctrine and ethics which has been much used as a students textbook.

References

Further reading
 

18th-century Roman Catholic theologians
1690 births
1775 deaths
People from Boom, Belgium
People of the Austrian Netherlands